Daniel Alan Brereton (born November 22 San Francisco Bay Area) is an American writer and illustrator who has produced notable work in the comic book field.

Biography

Early life
Dan Brereton attended the California College of the Arts and the Academy of Art College. He stated in a 2014 interview that "One of earliest memories of drawing monsters is from kindergarten. Our teacher asked us one afternoon what we wanted to do with the hour we had left in class and I yelled out, 'Let’s draw monsters!'...So to my mind, anyway, monsters are the purest product of our imaginations, whether they be good or bad or just plain wild. That idea never ceases to inspire me and find its way into my work."

Career

Comic books
He is known for his skills as a painter and his distinctive character designs. His first published work in the comics industry was the story "Lost Causes Chapter 1" in Merchants of Death #1 (July 1988) published by Eclipse Comics and he painted the Black Terror limited series in 1989–1990. Brereton gained further attention for his work on Batman: Thrillkiller, Superman and Batman: Legends of the World's Finest, and JLA: Seven Caskets, His most famous work is his own series "The Nocturnals."

Image Comics published Dan Brereton: The Goddess & The Monster, a collection of his work, in August 2010. Brereton wrote and drew a Batman story for DC Comics' digital first anthology series Legends of the Dark Knight in December 2015.

Other work
Outside the comic book field, Brereton's work includes the package illustration for a video game called "Machine Head,"  billboard and advertising art for Rawhide (a Wild West park in Scottsdale, Arizona), concept art for Pressman Films, the television show Numb3rs, development for Walt Disney Television Animation and album covers for the bands Toto, Fireball Ministry, Sote, Ghoultown, and Rob Zombie's Hellbilly Deluxe.

Awards and nominations
 1990: Won "Russ Manning Most Promising Newcomer" Eisner Award
 1991: Nominated for "Best Artist" Eisner Award
 1996: Nominated for "Best Painter" Eisner Award for Nocturnals:Black Planet
 1997: Nominated for "Best Painter" Eisner Award, for Batman: Thrillkiller

Bibliography
As artist unless noted:

 Merchants of Death #1–2 (Eclipse Comics) 1988
 The Black Terror #1–3 (Eclipse Comics) 1989–1990
 Clive Barker's Book of the Damned: A Hellraiser Companion (Epic Comics) 1991
 The Psycho #1–3 (artist/co-creator, DC Comics) 1991
 Interface #8 (one page, Epic Comics) 1991
 Clive Barker's Dread (Eclipse Comics) 1992
 That Chemical Reflex (CFD Productions) 1992
 Legends of the World's Finest #1–3 (DC Comics) 1993
 The Nocturnals: Black Planet #1–6 (writer/illustrator, Bravura/Malibu Comics, TPB: Oni Press) 1995
 Batgirl and Robin: Thrillkiller #1–3 (artist/co-creator, TPB, DC Comics) 1997
 Dark Horse Presents #125–127 (Dark Horse Comics) 1997
 Batgirl and Batman: Thrillkiller '62 #1 (artist/co-creator, TPB, DC Comics) 1998
  Nocturnals: Witching Hour #1 (writer/illustrator, Dark Horse Comics) 1998
 Superman: Silver Banshee #1–2 (writer/cover artist, DC Comics) 1998
 Batman: Legends of the Dark Knight #114 (DC Comics) 1998
 Buffy the Vampire Slayer: The Dust Waltz (writer, TPB, Dark Horse Comics) 1999
 Buffy the Vampire Slayer: The Origin (co-writer, TPB, Dark Horse Comics) 1999
 Giantkiller #1–6 (writer/illustrator, DC Comics, TPB Image) 1999–2000
 Giantkiller A to Z: A Field Guide to Big Monsters #1 (writer/illustrator, DC Comics, TPB Image) 1999
 Nocturnals: Troll Bridge (writer/illustrator, one-shot, Oni Press) 2000
 JLA: Seven Caskets (writer/illustrator, one-shot, DC Comics) 2000
 Nocturnals: The Dark Forever (writer/illustrator Oni Press) 2001
 The Gunwitch: Outskirts of Doom (writer, creator, co-cover artist Oni Press) 2001
 Ultimate Spider-Man Super Special (Marvel Comics) 2002
 Bart Simpson's Treehouse of Horror #9 (Bongo Comics) 2003
 The Nocturnals: A Midnight Companion (writer/artist Green Ronin) 2004
 The Escapist #2, Luna Moth Story (Dark Horse Comics) 2004
 L'Ultima Battaglia a.k.a. The Last Battle (Buena Vista Lab, Disney Worldwide Publishing) 2005
 The Simpsons Super Spectacular #2, "Bongos" (Bongo Comics) 2006
 Drop-Dead Girl & Other Drawings (Big Wow Publishing) 2006
 The Immortal Iron Fist Annual #1 (cover art, interior art with various artists, Marvel Comics) 2007
 The Nocturnals: Black Planet and Other Stories Volume I (hardcover collection Olympian Publishing) 2007
 The Nocturnals: Carnival of Beasts (writer/artist with various Image Comics) 2008
 Vampirella Quarterly: Halloween Special (writer, cover artist Harris Publications) 2008
 Thor: God-Size (Marvel Comics) 2008
 The Anchor #3 (cover artist variant Boom! Studios) 2009
 Secret Invasion Aftermath Beta Ray Bill: The Green of Eden (Marvel Comics) 2009
 Immortal Weapons #2 (Marvel Comics) 2009
 The Nocturnals: Dark Forever & Other Tales Volume II (hardcover collection Image Comics) 2009
 The Punisher vol. 8 #14 (interior art Marvel Comics) 2010
 Red Sonja Annual #3 (writer, cover artist and select interior art Dynamite Entertainment) 2010
 Claw and Fang #1 (cover artist Blue Water Comics) 2010
 Dracula: The Company Of Monsters #1 (cover artist Boom! Studios) 2010
 Red Sonja: Deluge (writer, cover artist Dynamite Entertainment) 2010
 Franken-Castle #21 (cover artist, interior art Marvel Comics) 2010
 Vampirella: The Red Room #1–4 (writer, cover artist Dynamite Entertainment) 2012

References

External links

Dan Brereton at Mike's Amazing World of Comics
Dan Brereton at the Unofficial Handbook of Marvel Comics Creators

1965 births
20th-century American artists
21st-century American artists
Academy of Art University alumni
Advertising artists and illustrators
Album-cover and concert-poster artists
American comics artists
American comics writers
American male painters
Artists from the San Francisco Bay Area
California College of the Arts alumni
DC Comics people
Eisner Award winners
Living people
Marvel Comics people
Role-playing game artists